Hafnium(IV) nitrate is an inorganic compound, a salt of hafnium and nitric acid with the chemical formula Hf(NO3)4.

Synthesis
Hafnium nitrate can be prepared by the reaction of hafnium tetrachloride and dinitrogen pentoxide.

Properties
Hafnium nitrate is slightly volatile, and can be sublimed at 110°c and 0.1 mmHg.

Hafnium nitrate decomposes on heating (≥160°C) to HfO(NO3)2 and then to HfO2.

Applications
Hafnium nitrate can be used for the preparation of materials containing hafnium dioxide.

References

Hafnium compounds
Nitrates